The 1851 colony of New Zealand census was the first national population census held in the Crown colony of New Zealand. The day used for the census was Saturday 1 November 1851. The enumeration was left to the governments of New Ulster and New Munster, the two provinces into which the country was then divided and was ordered by the Census Ordinance of 1851. The census, which only surveyed European New Zealanders, revealed a population of 26,707.

Summary
General Census of 1851
December 1851. (Reports appeared in Auckland Provincial Government Gazettes, 1853 and 1854.)

Data availability 
The Blue Books were statistical information from New Zealand's early Colonial period (1840–1855). They have information about population, revenue, military, trade, shipping, public works, legislation, civil servants, foreign consuls, land transactions, churches, schools, and prisons.

Population and dwellings

Population counts for the New Zealand districts. 
The original six were Auckland, New Plymouth, Wellington, Nelson, Canterbury, and Otago, though in 1858 New Plymouth was renamed Taranaki.

Birthplace

Religion
Members of Christian denominations formed 93.35 per cent. of those who made answer to the inquiry at the census; non-Christian sects were 0.24 per cent.; whilst "other" religions constituted 6.41 per cent.

Numbers of livestock
Showing the numbers of livestock in the possession of Europeans in the several settlements in 1851.

References

Censuses in New Zealand
1851 in New Zealand
November 1851 events
New Zealand